Richard Eichhorn, professionally known as Richie Rich, is an American fashion designer, television personality, figure skater, singer, actor and author. During the 1990s, he was part of the original group of New York City dance club personalities named Club Kids.

Rich was born in the New York Metropolitan Area and at a young age, his family relocated to San Jose, California where he began studying theater and competing in figure skating.

In 1999, Rich and Traver Rains founded the fashion company, Heatherette.

Early life and discovery
Rich was born in New York and relocated to California at 3 years old, and was raised in California. The nickname “Richie Rich” derived from the teasing of other children.

Rich began figure skating at a young age with the famous Ice Capades. During his teen years, Rich would sneak out of his house to listen to music at Club I-Beam in San Francisco's Haight-Ashbury neighborhood.

In the fall of 1992, Julie Jules encouraged Rich to enter the “Club Kid Style Summit” contest.  Rich entered and won a trip to New York City to host the opening of Club USA on December 17, 1992.

Early career

Ice Capades 
While training under coach Christy Kjarsgaard Ness, trainer of Kristi Yamaguchi for the Olympics, Rich was scouted to tour as a skating performer with the Ice Capades under the choreography of two-time Emmy winner Sarah Kawahara. Kawahara's choreography subjects include Peggy Fleming, the 2002 Olympics opening ceremony, Will Ferrell in “Blades of Glory” and Margot Robbie in I, Tonya.

Original Club Kid 
As a club kid in the '90s and a fixture of The Limelight, Rich created a name for himself attending parties with Michael Alig and DJ Keoki, drawing attention with his theatrical clown-punk makeup and over-the-top outfits that he made himself.

The New York club kids of the late ’80s and early ’90s picked up where Studio 54 left off. Gay kids, trans kids, fashion freaks and art weirdoes all converged nightly in cult Manhattan hotspots like Danceteria and The Limelight. They would wear outrageous outfits and party to thumping house music.

Fashion

Heatherette 
The name Heatherette was inspired by an opera singer named Heather and the song by Grace Jones: "Warm Leatherette".

Heatherette was launched in 2001, with a runway show during New York Fashion Week featuring a video by photographer, David LaChapelle, starring Amanda Lepore for a collaboration with MAC Cosmetics. Heatherette continued as a part of the official New York Fashion Week 16 times over a period of 9 years.

Heatherette has been featured in publications such as Vogue, Teen Vogue, Vanity Fair, GQ, Time, Newsweek, Glamour, Elle, People, Paper, Rolling Stone, Billboard, Trace, W, WWD, New York Times, and others.

MAC Cosmetics 
On March 20, 2008, a collaboration collection with MAC Cosmetics, called "Heatherette for MAC", was released and includes illustrations of Traver Rains and Richie Rich on the cardboard packaging. The limited edition line included much more than the original collaboration. The full line included powders, lipsticks, eye shadows, eye pencils, glitter, and nail polish.

A*Muse, Popluxe, Villionaire 
In 2008 Rich showed the line at the Waldorf Astoria New York Ballroom, titled "Richie Rich", with a guest appearance by Pamela Anderson. Inspired by his longtime friend, Rich and Anderson launched a capsule collection playfully titled A*Muse.

The limited collection included t-shirts and swimsuits featuring images of Anderson and Rich. They launched a fashion tour, titled A*muse, in New Zealand, Vancouver, Montreal, Toronto, Miami, and Chicago.

Rich went on to launch two collections with former business partner and fashion executive, Keri Ingvarsson and with Chris Coffee of Gotham Beauty called Popluxe.

Popluxe debuted at Lincoln Center during New York's Mercedes Benz Fashion Week, with a guest runway appearance by Ellen DeGeneres.

The second collection, called Villionaire, premiered at New York's Hammerstein Ballroom with runway appearances by Johnny Weir and MTV's JWoww.

BEAUTYKWEEN 
In 2020, Richie Rich was named Fashion Director of virtual beauty club, http://www.beautykween.com .

Television

In addition to appearances on the talk show circuit as a Club Kid, Rich was a featured role as himself on the Ashton Kutcher produced WB series, The Beautiful Life, guest judged on multiple iterations of Top Model (America, Canada, Germany), Project Runway (America, Canada, Germany) and has appeared on various other shows such as MTV's My Super Sweet 16, Made, TRL, VH1's Supergroup, Basketball Wives, The Fabulous Life of... (Pamela Anderson and Nicky Hilton), The Anna Nicole Show on E!, MTV News, Logo TV, the Tonight Show, The Tyra Banks Show, RTL German Television (mini reality series), The Today Show, Good Day New York Live, NBC's Fashion on Ice Live, etc.

Filmography
 Shampoo Horns (1998)
 Zoolander (2001)
 Party Monster (2003)
 One Last Thing... (2005)
 My Super Ex-Girlfriend (2006)

Discography

References

External links 

BEAUTYKWEEN Official Site - https://www.beautykween.com

American fashion designers
Club Kids
LGBT fashion designers
Living people
1970 births